Punakaiki is a small village on the West Coast of the South Island of New Zealand. Punakaiki is immediately adjacent to Paparoa National Park, and is also the access point for a popular visitor attraction, the Pancake Rocks and Blowholes.

Location 
Because State Highway 6 is the only through-road on the West Coast, a large number of visitors pass through the town.

The village is on the southern border of Buller District, where it meets Grey District, and lies on the edge of Paparoa National Park. To the north is the sheer bluff Perpendicular Point, known as Te Miko. The settlement sits to the south, by the Pororari Lagoon at the mouth of the Porarari River. To the south of the village is Dolomite Point, site of the Pancake Rocks, and Razorback Point at the mouth of the Punakaiki River. A feature of this part of the West Coast are the steep forested bluffs and cliffs of the Paparoa Range, descending several hundred metres to small beaches and sheer headlands, with occasional flats and terraces in between.

History 

The coastal caves and overhangs of the area bear traces of seasonal Māori occupation, and by the time Europeans arrived the area was the home of the Ngāti Waewae people, a hapū of Kai Tahu, who traded much-prized pounamu.

Early European explorers navigating the coast encountered sheer cliffs at Te Miko, navigable only by climbing ladders totalling 46 feet high (or so Haast estimated) made of harakeke and rotting rātā vine. Charles Heaphy noted in 1846 that "…as several of the rotten steps gave way under our feet, our position was far from being pleasant. A number of cormorants and other marine birds, too, that had their nests in the crevices of the rock were screaming and wheeling about us at the intrusion." During the gold rush of the 1860s these were replaced by chain ladders, soon known as "Jacob's Ladder", but the wooden rungs were destroyed by overuse, and travellers slid down the chains instead or jammed sticks into the links.

There was, however, an inland trail crossing a higher terrace through rātā forest; prospector William Smart was guided through it by local Māori to avoid the "rotten" ladders. By October 1866 the authorities had cut a track to avoid the ladders, but it soon degenerated into a morass. In 1867 under-employed "diggers"(prospectors) were used to cut the "Razorback Road", now known as the Inland Pack Track, to avoid the coast completely, heading up the Fox River, south through rough hill country, and emerging at the mouth of the Punakaiki River. The route which linked Cobden, north of Greymouth, with the gold workings at Brighton on the mouth of the Fox River, cost perhaps £10,000 and was completed by October 1867, but was not a success: it required too many river crossings that were difficult in times of flood, and after the gold rush ended and the diggers moved on it fell into disrepair. In January 1873 the Grey River Argus called the road "perfectly useless" and it was little-used after the 1870s.

Travellers who crossed Te Miko plateau stopped at the Pororari River lagoon, and waited for low tide to cross the mudflats (while avoiding quicksand). A dry limestone overhang on the north side of the lagoon was a convenient place to wait, and became known as the "Post Office", because diggers would leave messages and carve their names into the walls. As late as 1931 graffiti like "Sandy 1866" and "Hamilton Nov 20/65" were still visible.

After crossing the present-day site of Punakaiki, the path went over the Dolomite Point headland and down to Punakaiki River. There is no record of early travellers noticing or commenting on the Pancake Rock formations, which are only 15 minutes off the track, and Māori do not seem to have pointed them out to early European explorers. Those heading south to the diggings at Canoe Creek still had to navigate the Razorback, navigating a narrow path between a deep chasm on one side and a sheer drop to the beach on the other. A vehicular road was not built here until 1929, finally connecting Greymouth and Westport.

In 2018, the remnants of Cyclone Fehi caused severe damage to the road immediately north of Dolomite point.  Improvements costing $7.8 million were completed by Waka Kotahi NZ Transport Agency to provide more resilience to this section of State Highway 6.

Population 
There are fewer than 100 permanent residents, but the village has been host to at least 500,000 visitors in some years.

Wildlife and conservation 
Located on the edge of the Paparoa National Park, Punakaiki has a diverse range of birdlife and marine wildlife. Fur seals are seen on the rocks and Hector's dolphins close to the shore. Birds seen in the area include blue penguin, blue shag, black shag, Australasian gannet, white-faced heron, weka, kererū, tui, bellbird, fantail, grey warbler, and tomtit. 

The Westland petrel has its only known breeding colonies close to Punakaiki. The breeding range is in forest-covered coastal foothills in an 8 kilometre wide strip between Barrytown and Punakaiki, specifically between the Punakaiki River and Waiwhero (Lawson) Creek. These colonies were established in the middle of the 18th century. The Department of Conservation designated the colony area as the Westland Petrel Special Protected Area in 1999 and access by the public is restricted. There is a breeding colony located on private land, where guided tours of the colony are available.

Limestone caves in the Punakaiki area preserved animal fossils dating back 25,000 years which help us visualize the fauna of the Otira Glaciation period. This fauna includes a variety of large and smalls (including moas), amphibians, reptiles, and potentially bats and kiwi.

Local conservation efforts include the Punakaiki Coastal Restoration Project which was started by the Department of Conservation, aluminum production company Rio Tinto, and Conservation Volunteers in 2009. The Project covers 40 ha. 4 km south of Punakaiki and is managed to restore the Sand Forest Flats and provide a forest to sea corridor. The land is owned by the Department of Conservation and includes the last remaining Westland petrel breeding site on mainland New Zealand.

Tourism 

In the period immediately before the COVID-19 pandemic, around 500,000 visitors each year passed through Punakaiki, and most stopped at Dolomite Point to walk out and view the Pancake Rocks and Blowholes. The peak visitor numbers were around 6,000 a day. Overseas visitors made up 92% of the business at the local Punakaiki tavern, and 85% at the Punakaiki campground. The large number of visitors to the small village has put a strain on local infrastructure, and requires levels of investment that cannot be funded by the small number of ratepayers. Some of the main concerns were the inadequate provision of car parks and toilet facilities to meet demand at peak times.

There had also been concerns from the local community about the behaviour and impact of "freedom campers" – those who stay the night in their cars or campervans in a public place, rather than the campground. In 2016, residents petitioned the Buller District and Grey District councils for a ban on freedom camping in the town, but this appeal was not successful.

On 19 March 2020, all New Zealand's borders and entry ports were closed to non-residents in response to the pandemic. Staged re-opening of the borders did not begin until February 2022. With New Zealand's borders being closed for such an extended period, local tourism operators in Punakaiki had to adjust to lower volumes, and to refocus on attracting domestic visitors.

In January 2022, the campground operators reported that they had been fully booked over the Christmas holiday season, with most of the visitors from the South Island, and many coming to do the Paparoa Track. However, tourism operators reported major reductions in bookings for the period after the summer school holidays.

Visitor centre 

The Paparoa National Park visitor centre is located at Dolomite Point, opposite the entrance to the Pancake Rocks & Blowholes.

In September 2020, as part of an economic stimulus in response to the pandemic, the Government announced a grant from the Provincial Growth Fund for redevelopment of visitor facilities at Punakaiki. The $26 million project included a new visitor centre, Department of Conservation (DOC) information centre, community meeting room, and offices for the local hapū, Ngāti Waewae. There was also funding for a highway crossing and car park, and a walking and cycling path to improve accessibility for visitors. One unusual aspect of the plans for the "Experience Centre" was a green roof. Seeds and seedlings of around a dozen species chosen for the roof were gathered from the local area and 11,000 plants were raised in a Conservation Volunteers New Zealand nursery at Barrytown Flats for subsequent establishment on the roof of the building. There was controversy in 2021 about the decision to transfer the facility to Ngāti Waewae on completion, and plans for charging visitors for entry to the "Experience Centre". A ceremony to mark the start of construction on the new visitor cente was led by Ngāti Waewae on 28 May 2022.

Pancake Rocks 

The Pancake Rocks are a very popular tourist destination at Dolomite Point south of the main village. From a visitor centre and cafe a wheelchair-navigable path leads to the stylobedded pancake rock formations and central Putai Blowhole, which spouts spectacularly at high tide and during a south-westerly swell.

Punakaiki cavern 

One of the nearby attractions in Punakaiki is an easily accessible cavern.

Walks in the local area 
Popular local walks in the Punakaiki area include:

 Pancake Rocks and Blowholes
 Truman Track
 Pororari River
 Punakaki River, and a Pororari River loop via the Inland Pack Track
 Pororari River, and a Bullock Creek loop via the Inland Pack Track
 Cave Creek / Kotihotiho Memorial Track

The track is the tenth New Zealand Great Walk to be created, and has been fully open since 1 March 2020.

References

External links

 Punakaiki - West Coast, New Zealand (tourism information from the Punakaiki Promotions Group)
 Limestone, Punakaiki (1st of 3) (entry on Te Ara: The Encyclopedia of New Zealand)

Blowholes
Populated coastal places in New Zealand
Buller District
Populated places in the West Coast, New Zealand
Paparoa National Park